A list of adventure films released in the 1980s.

1980

1981

1982

1983

1984

1985

1986

1987

1988

1989

Notes

1980s adventure films
1980s
Adventure